A drummer is someone who plays a drum.

Drummer may also refer to:

 Drummer (military)
 Drummer (soil), the state soil of Illinois, named for Drummer Township, Ford County, Illinois
 Drummer (band), an indie rock band
 Drummer (magazine), a gay male leather magazine
 Drummer (cockroach), a species of cockroach, Blaberus discoidalis
 Drummer, a private in the Corps of Drums in the British Army
 Drummer, a character in the Planetary comics series
 a travelling salesman, one who "drums up" business

See also
The Drummer (disambiguation)